The Harnaut–Mokama loop also known as Coal Belt Loop which connects  and . Originally a part of the Howrah–Delhi main line & Bakhtiyarpur–Tilaiya line, it was opened to traffic in 2016.

The line carries coal from Jharkhand state to most important NTPC Barh. With the construction of a shorter railway line for a part of the route, the  stretch was assigned a separate identity.

Branch line

Railway workshop & Industry
Two major Industries along with this line 
 Rail Coach Factory, Harnaut &
 NTPC Barh

References

Rail transport in Bihar
5 ft 6 in gauge railways in India
Railway lines opened in 2016